Duke Zhuang of Qin (died 778 BC) was from 821 to 778 BC the fifth ruler of the Zhou Dynasty state of Qin that eventually united China to become the Qin Dynasty. His ancestral name was Ying.

Reign
Duke Zhuang became the Qin ruler after his father Qin Zhong was killed in battle against the Rong tribes in 822 BC.  King Xuan of Zhou gave Duke Zhuang and his four younger brothers seven thousand soldiers, and they defeated the Rong. King Xuan then awarded Qin the territory of Quanqiu (犬丘, also called Xichui, in present-day Li County, Gansu), formerly belonging to the senior branch of the House of Ying that was destroyed by the Rong, and Duke Zhuang moved the capital of the state from Qin (in present-day Zhangjiachuan County, Gansu) to Quanqiu.

Family
Duke Zhuang had three sons. The eldest, Shifu (世父), refused the throne, preferring to campaign against the Rong tribes who killed his grandfather, Qin Zhong. Duke Zhuang died in 778 BC after a reign of 44 years and was succeeded by his second eldest son Duke Xiang of Qin. Duke Zhuang's daughter, Mu Ying (缪嬴), entered a political marriage with Rong leader King Feng (豐王) in 777 BC.

Posthumous title
Although the state of Qin grew much bigger and stronger after Duke Zhuang's victory against the Rong, Qin was still a minor state at the time and its rulers did not have any nobility rank. However, Duke Zhuang's son Duke Xiang would later be granted a formal nobility rank by King Ping of Zhou as a reward for protecting the king during the Quanrong invasion, and Duke Zhuang would also be posthumously granted the honorific title of duke.

References

Year of birth unknown
Rulers of Qin
9th-century BC Chinese monarchs
8th-century BC Chinese monarchs
778 BC deaths